Stephen Michael Wedgwood Benn, 3rd Viscount Stansgate (born 21 August 1951), is a British hereditary peer and Labour member of the House of Lords.

Early life 
His father, Tony Benn, and his younger brother, Hilary Benn, have both been senior Labour politicians.  His mother was Caroline Benn an educationalist and writer, and his sister is Melissa Benn, a feminist writer.

Education 
He is a graduate of Keele University. He was an elected Member of the Inner London Education Authority from 1986 to 1990.

He attended Holland Park Comprehensive School from 1962 to 1968.

Career 
In 2011, he was appointed director of parliamentary affairs for the Society of Biology after spending two decades in a similar role for the Royal Society of Chemistry. He is also a Vice-President of the Parliamentary and Scientific Committee.

Benn succeeded to the title of Viscount Stansgate on the death of his father in March 2014. His active acceptance of the title was recorded on 10 November 2014 with a note in the minutes of Proceedings from the House of Lords, stating:
"The Lord Chancellor reported that Stephen Michael Wedgwood Benn had established his claim to the Viscountcy of Stansgate in the Peerage of the United Kingdom. The Clerk of the Parliaments was accordingly directed to enter Viscount Stansgate on the register of hereditary peers maintained under Standing Order 10(5)."

He stood for election as a Labour hereditary peer in the House of Lords and was elected unopposed on 10 July 2021, replacing Lord Rea who died in 2020; he took the oath on 6 September that year. He made his maiden speech on Thursday 14 October 2021 on the debate of Regional Strategy debate, with his brother Hilary Benn watching on.

Personal life 
Lord Stansgate has a daughter, Emily, born in 1989, and a son, Daniel John Wedgwood Benn, born in 1991 with his wife Nita Clarke. Emily, an investment banker by occupation, pursued a political career, and sat on the Croydon London Borough Council as a Labour member until she resigned in 2016 on moving to New York.

References

Sources
Father's obituary

1951 births
Living people
Alumni of Keele University
Benn family
English people of American descent
English activists
English landowners
People from Essex
Scientists from London
Viscounts in the Peerage of the United Kingdom
Labour Party (UK) hereditary peers

Hereditary peers elected under the House of Lords Act 1999